Casper Chan is a Hong Kong actress. Notable roles include a hotel employee in 7 Days in Life, and Legend of the Demigods as a magistrates daughter.

Television
Beyond the Rainbow (2015)
Sexpedia (2015)
The Menu (2015)
Incredible Mama (2015)
The Election (HKTV, 2014)
No Good Either Way (TVB, 2012)
Super Snoops (TVB, 2011)
River of Wine (TVB, 2011)
 Yes, Sir. Sorry, Sir! (TVB, 2011)
My Sister of Eternal Flower (TVB, 2011)
The Mysteries of Love (TVB, 2010)
7 Days in Life (TVB, 2010)
Can't Buy Me Love (TVB, 2010)
Just Love II (TVB, 2009)
E.U. (TVB, 2009)
Sweetness in the Salt (TVB, 2009)
The Gem of Life (TVB, 2008)
The Four (TVB, 2008, Ep.03-04 cameo:Siu-tou)
Legend of the Demigods (TVB, 2008)
Moonlight Resonance (TVB, 2008, cameo)
When a Dog Loves a Cat (TVB, 2008)
On the First Beat (TVB, 2007)
Devil's Disciples (TVB, 2007)
War and Destiny (TVB, 2007)
Best Bet (TVB, 2007)
The White Flame (TVB, 2007)
Placebo Cure (TVB, 2006)
Forensic Heroes (TVB, 2006)
Into Thin Air (TVB, 2005)
Wars of In-Laws (TVB, 2005)
Just Love (TVB, 2005)
The Academy (TVB, 2005)
To Love with No Regrets (TVB, 2004)
Hard Fate (TVB, 2004)
Triumph in the Skies (TVB, 2003)
Life Begins at Forty (TVB, 2003)
Survivor's Law (TVB, 2003)
Virtues of Harmony II (TVB, 2003, cameo)
Virtues of Harmony (TVB, 2001, cameo)

References

TVB veteran actors
21st-century Hong Kong actresses
Living people
1982 births